The sixth and final season of Netflix's animated comedy-drama television series BoJack Horseman consists of sixteen episodes and is divided into two parts of eight episodes each. The first part was entirely released into Netflix's streaming service on October 25, 2019. The second part was released on January 31, 2020.

Cast and characters

Main
Will Arnett as BoJack Horseman, Butterscotch Horseman, and Secretariat
Amy Sedaris as Princess Carolyn and Sharona
Alison Brie as Diane Nguyen
Paul F. Tompkins as Mr. Peanutbutter
Aaron Paul as Todd Chavez

Recurring

Guest

Episodes

Critical response
The final season received near universal acclaim with critics and viewers considering it a poignant end to the series. On the review aggregator Rotten Tomatoes, the sixth season has an approval rating of 96%, based on 51 reviews. The website's critical consensus states, "Bittersweet and brilliant to the very end, BoJack Horsemans final season manages to keep surprising viewers with its empathy and depth, solidifying its place as one of TV's greatest offerings." On Metacritic, the first part of the sixth season received a score of 93 out of 100 based on 6 critics; the second part received a score of 91 out of 100, based on 8 critics, both indicating "universal acclaim".

"Xerox of a Xerox" won the Writers Guild of America Award for Television: Animation at the 73rd Writers Guild of America Awards.

References

2019 American television seasons
2020 American television seasons
BoJack Horseman seasons
Split television seasons